The film score to the 1992 film Trespass, was heavily influenced by experimental jazz. The performers include producers Ry Cooder and Jim Keltner, as well as Jon Hassell.

Track listing
 Cooder, Hassell, Keltner – "Video Drive-By" – 1:55
 Cooder, Hassell, Keltner – "Trespass (Main Title)" – 1:38
 Cooder, Hassell, Keltner – "East St. Louis" – 2:01
 Cooder, Hassell, Keltner – "Orgill Bros." – 1:44
 Cooder, Hassell, Keltner – "Goose and Lucky" – 3:35
 Cooder, Hassell, Keltner – "You Think It's on Now" – 1:41
 Cooder, Hassell, Keltner – "Solid Gold" – 0:58
 Cooder, Hassell, Keltner – "Heroin" – 4:13
 Cooder, Hassell, Keltner – "Totally Boxed In" – 6:48
 Cooder, Hassell, Keltner – "Give' Em Cops" – 1:27
 Cooder, Hassell, Keltner – "Lucy in the Trunk" –3:46
 Cooder, Hassell, Keltner – "We're Rich" – 2:26
 Cooder, Hassell, Keltner – "King of the Streets" – 3:59
 Cooder, Hassell, Keltner – "Party Lights" – 3:00

See also
 Trespass (soundtrack)

References 

Ry Cooder albums
Film scores
Jazz soundtracks
1993 soundtrack albums